The dark freckled catshark (Scyliorhinus ugoi) is a catshark of the family Scyliorhinidae. It is found in Northeastern and Southeastern Brazil. This species differs from Scyliorhinus besnardi, Scyliorhinus haeckelii group and Scyliorhinus hesperius, in background coloration, head width, sexual maturity, and in cranial and body proportions.

References

dark freckled catshark
Fish of Brazil
dark freckled catshark